Schillerstraße (Schiller Street) was a German improvisational comedy show that aired weekly on Sat.1. It was recorded without a script and broadcast unedited to a large extent. The American broadcaster Fox has earned the licence for Schillerstraße and is to produce its own series.

Idea and show structure
The setting of the show is the living room of the main actor (until 2008 Cordula Stratmann, in 2009 Jürgen Vogel - all the actors keep their real names) who lives on the fictional street "Schillerstraße" in Cologne, Germany. The main character is regularly visited by friends and relatives. The participants only know the topic of the episode in advance. The whole plot has to be improvised comically. The cast receive directions from the Spielleiter (game master) on their headphones, and have to follow the cues, e.g. "Cordula: Tell the others you're pregnant!". The show mostly airs unedited and things that go wrong are not removed, either.

The main cast have included Cordula Stratmann, Annette Frier, Martin "Maddin" Schneider, Michael Kessler and Ralf Schmitz. They interchange with dozens of other guests.

The show was created by Maike Tatzig who is also the show's executive producer. In September 2005 she took over the task of the game master, after Georg Uecker left or had to leave the show for unknown reasons.

The show is produced by Hurricane Fernsehproduktion GmbH.

Development
Schillerstraße first aired on 3 September 2004 on the German TV channel Sat.1. The episodes originally only lasted 30 minutes were aired in the later evening programme and were a big success. For this reason, the run time was extended in January 2005 and moved into a prime time slot on Thursdays. On 26 January 2007 Schillerstraße got a new slot during Friday evening prime time and started with a special 90-minute 100th episode broadcast in which the actors and the game master Maike Tatzig looked back at the previous 99 episodes. The former game master Georg Uecker was not mentioned once; instead they decided to make it look like Maike Tatzig had been the game master since the beginning of the show.

After Uecker left the show, producer Maike Tatzig became the game master in autumn 2005, officially due to schedule problems of Uecker.

On 20 April 2006 the stage was extended. So that the show could reasonably be continued without Cordula Stratmann, who was on maternity leave and was therefore not available for some episodes, they created a pub next door, the Schillereck (Schiller corner). Stratmann's pregnancy was never part of the show. Her character on the show became fat and had to go to a diet camp. The pub is "owned" by Bernhard Hoëcker, a friend of Cordula's. The stages are set in a right angle. To be able to use both stages in one show, a rotatable audience stand was constructed.

Awards won

Episodes

Season 1

Season 2

Season 3

Season 4

Season 5

International versions
The format was sold internationally and the rights were sold to the American media company Fox which is going to produce the show in the United States, Great Britain, Australia, New Zealand and Canada. The rights have been sold as well to France, Italy, Spain, Belgium, the Netherlands, Finland, Estonia, Russia, Romania, Hungary, Turkey, Czech Republic,  Israel and Bulgaria.

In South Africa the show is produced and aired by Afrikaans channel kykNet under the title Proesstraat.

In 2011 the show was canceled in Germany.

References
Notes

Sources

External links
Official Schillerstraße webpage of Sat.1

German comedy television series
2004 German television series debuts
2011 German television series endings
German-language television shows
Sat.1 original programming